Gregory Forristall (February 15, 1950 – May 10, 2017) was an American politician who served in the Iowa House of Representatives from 2007 until his death in 2017.

Prior to his death, Forristall served on several committees in the Iowa House, including Human Resources, Transportation, and Ways and Means committees. He also served as the chair of the Labor committee and as a member of the Economic Development Appropriations Subcommittee.

Early life and education
Forristall was born in Council Bluffs, Iowa and was raised and lived near Macedonia. After graduation from Carson-Macedonia High School in 1968, he went on to complete coursework in computer science and international marketing at Iowa Western Community College and earned bachelor's and master's degrees in music at the University of Iowa in 1972 and 1973 respectively.

Career 
Forristall worked as a farmer for 25 years and also worked in the financial services and information technology industries.

Forristall was active in the community with organizations such as the Council Bluffs Sister Cities, Farm Bureau, the Iowa Corn Promotion Board and the Iowa Western Community College Board. He was a member of the United States Grain Council and served on the Iowa State Board of Education and the Iowa Community College Council. Forristall was a founding and continuing member of the Grist Mill Fine Arts Council.

He chaired the Education Task Force of the American Legislative Exchange Council and was on the executive committee of the Midwest Higher Education Compact. Forristall also represented Iowa in national meetings of the Lumina Foundation and the Foundation for Excellence in Education.

Forristall was first elected to represent House District 98 in November 2006. He shifted to representing District 22 when the maps were redrawn in 2010.

In March 2014, he filed a police report stating he had been assaulted by a private citizen at Iowa State Capitol. During a June 2014 trial lasting two days, a jury of six people determined the defendant not guilty after one hour of deliberation.

Personal life 
He resided in Macedonia, Iowa with his wife, Carol, who taught music in Iowa public schools for thirty-five years. The two were married in 1978.

Forristall died on May 10, 2017 in Omaha, Nebraska of cancer at the age of 67. Following his death, his wife Carol sought to replace him. She lost the Republican nomination to Jon Jacobsen.

Electoral history
*incumbent

References

External links 

 Representative Greg Forristall official Iowa General Assembly site
 
 Financial information (state office) at the National Institute for Money in State Politics

1950 births
2017 deaths
Republican Party members of the Iowa House of Representatives
Politicians from Council Bluffs, Iowa
People from Pottawattamie County, Iowa
University of Iowa alumni
Iowa Western Community College alumni
School board members in Iowa
21st-century American politicians
Deaths from cancer in Iowa